Debs might refer to:

Surname:
 Bandali Debs (born 1953), Australian convicted serial killer
 Barbara Knowles Debs (born 1931), American art historian and former president of Manhattanville College
 Ernest E. Debs (1904–2002), American politician
 Eugene V. Debs (1855–1926), American union leader and presidential candidate of the Socialist Party of America
 Felipe El Debs (born 1985), Brazilian chess Grandmaster

Given name:
 Debs Garms (1907–1984), American Major League Baseball player

Other uses:
 Debs, Minnesota, United States, a small town
 D.E.B.S. (2003 film), a short, independent film about a squad of heroines
 D.E.B.S. (2004 film), a feature-length film spawned by the short film
 Debs School, Colorado, United States, a one-room schoolhouse on the National Register of Historic Places
 Debs (ball), a formal ball for schools in Ireland

See also
 Deb (disambiguation)
 Debes
 Debra (disambiguation)
 Debbie (disambiguation)
 Deborah (disambiguation)